Bipunctiphorus nigroapicalis is a moth of the family Pterophoridae. It is known from the Galápagos Islands and Venezuela.

The wingspan is 11–15 mm. Adults are on wing from January to April and in September and October.

Etymology
The name is derived from the dark apex of its forewing lobes.

References

External links

Platyptiliini
Moths described in 1992